Wexford Creek is a very minor tributary of the Upper Mississippi River, confined entirely to Lafayette Township in Allamakee County, Iowa. Its drainage area measures . It enters the river into Lake Winneshiek (Navigation Pool 9) opposite Lynxville, Wisconsin. The area is entirely rural, with some cleared farmland, but is mostly forested.

See also
List of rivers of Iowa

Sources

US Geological Survey (*.pdf)
Iowa Department of Natural Resources
 cLocation, with map

Tributaries of the Mississippi River
Rivers of Allamakee County, Iowa
Rivers of Iowa